The 2021 season is Geylang International's 26th consecutive season in the top flight of Singapore football and in the Singapore Premier League. Along with the Singapore Premier League, the club will also compete in the Singapore Cup.

Season Progress Key Milestones
 In March 2021, Zikos Chua is ruled out of the season after enlistment to NS.
 In April 2021, Nur Luqman Rahman is ruled out of the season after suffering an anterior cruciate ligament (ACL) injury in match against Tampines Rovers on 16 April 2021.
 In May 2021, Sylvano Comvalius agreed to mutually terminate his contract with the Eagles after feeling homesick. His family application to join him in Singapore was rejected due to COVID-19.
 In May 2021, Ex-Malaysia Cup star Abbas Saad returns to Singapore for short coaching stint, joining the Eagle as Noor Ali's assistant.
 In 14 Sept 2021, a member of Geylang International FC (GIFC)‘s playing squad has tested positive following a COVID-19 polymerase chain reaction (PCR) test.

Squad

Singapore Premier League

U21

Coaching staff

Transfers

In

Pre-season 

Note 1: Danish Irfan was loaned to Young Lions FC for 2021 season.

Note 2: Fikri Junaidi was released and joined Albirex Niigata for 2021 season.

Mid-season

Loan In 

Pre-season

Out

Pre-season 

Mid-season

Loan Out 

Pre-season

Extension / Retained

Friendlies

Pre-season friendlies

In-season friendlies

Team statistics

Appearances and goals

Competitions

Overview

Singapore Premier League

AFC Cup

On 11 November 2020, the AFC approved a new calendar for the competition due to the COVID-19 pandemic, where the group stage is played as centralized single round-robin tournament, and the preliminary round, play-off round, and ASEAN Zone semi-finals and final are played as a single match.

Group stage

Singapore Cup

See also 
 2007 Geylang United FC season
 2008 Geylang United FC season
 2009 Geylang United FC season
 2010 Geylang United FC season
 2011 Geylang United FC season
 2012 Geylang International FC season
 2013 Geylang International FC season
 2014 Geylang International FC season
 2015 Geylang International FC season
 2016 Geylang International FC season
 2017 Geylang International FC season
 2018 Geylang International FC season
 2019 Geylang International FC season
 2020 Geylang International FC season

Notes

References 

Geylang International FC
Geylang International FC seasons